Ian Robert McKegney (born May 7, 1947) is a Canadian former professional ice hockey player. McKegney played three games in the National Hockey League for the Chicago Black Hawks.

McKegney spent a season in Sweden in 1971–72 and then mostly with the Dallas Black Hawks from 1972 to 1977. After his NHL stint he played with the Nova Scotia Voyageurs and Innsbrucker EV in Austria before ending his professional career in 1979.

References

External links
 

1947 births
Living people
Canadian ice hockey defencemen
Chicago Blackhawks players
Ice hockey people from Ontario
Sportspeople from Sarnia
Undrafted National Hockey League players